Frontiers in Endocrinology is a peer-reviewed open access scientific journal covering all aspects of endocrinology in 21 sections. It was established in 2010 and is published by Frontiers Media. The editor-in-chief is Jeffrey M. P. Holly (University of Bristol).

Abstracting and indexing
The journal is abstracted and indexed in:

According to the Journal Citation Reports, the journal has an impact factor of 6.055 in 2021

History
From 1993 to 1995 a monographic series named Frontiers in Endocrinology was published by Ares-Serono Symposia Publications for 15 volumes. The current journal was established in 2010. In order to distinguish the two periodicals some indices use the names Frontiers in Endocrinology (Rome, Italy) for the older series and Frontiers in Endocrinology (Lausanne) for the current journal.

References

External links
 

English-language journals
Endocrinology journals
Open access journals
Publications established in 2010
Frontiers Media academic journals